Cophotis dumbara, the Dumbara agama, is an agamid species endemic to Sri Lanka. Known only from Knuckles Mountain Range. It is classified as a critically endangered species due to habitat loss and logging.

Description
Adult reaches 60.0 mm SVL in length. 111–120 mid-ventral scales. Head rhomboid dorsally. Orbital rim not prominent.  Supraorbital ridge with a row of large, carinate scales. There is a supraorbital ridge with a row of large, carinate scales. Nasal scale pentagonal. Supraciliary scales carinate and elongate. Tympanum subdermal. Chest scales triangular.

Male has a pale greenish yellow on upper lip. Lower lip dark greenish black. A light greenish-yellow band extends from snout tip to axilla. Blackish loreal and temporal regions with light greenish yellow scales. Pupil black. Iris blackish with golden pigments. Dorsal crest black, which contain pale green patches. Middle part of throat is reddish orange. Tail consists of seven greenish yellow and seven black cross-bands.

Female has a buff colored throat with longitudinal brown streaks. Upper and lower lips light brown with black patches. Tail consists of seven greenish buff and eight brown cross-bands.

References

 
 http://reptile-database.reptarium.cz/species?genus=Cophotis&species=dumbara

External links 
 http://novataxa.blogspot.com/2011/11/2006-cophotis-dumbarae-srilanka.html
 http://zipcodezoo.com/animals/c/cophotis_dumbara/
 https://web.archive.org/web/20140714230811/http://www.biologybrowser.org/node/1223170
 http://slendemics.net/easl/reps/Agamidae.html

Cophotis
Endemic fauna of Sri Lanka
Reptiles of Sri Lanka
Critically endangered fauna of Asia
Lizards of Asia
Reptiles described in 2006
Taxa named by Natalia B. Ananjeva
Taxa named by Nikolai Loutseranovitch Orlov